Ski Resort Tycoon  II is a business simulation game in which the player must successfully create and run a ski resort.  This is the second game in a series.  The first, Ski Resort Tycoon was released a year earlier in Fall/Winter 2000.

External links
 Developer website
 Publisher website

2001 video games
Business simulation games
Windows games
Windows-only games
Skiing mass media
Cat Daddy Games games
Single-player video games
Activision games
Video games developed in the United States